The Borssele Nuclear Power Station (Kerncentrale Borssele) is a nuclear power plant near the Dutch town of Borssele. It has a pressurised water reactor (PWR). Borssele is the only nuclear power plant still operational for electricity production in the Netherlands. Its net output is 485 MWe.

History
The Borssele nuclear power plant was built by Siemens and has been operational since 1973. Originally it was built primarily to supply relatively cheap electricity to an aluminum smelting facility, opened by French concern Pechiney at a nearby site in 1971, that for many years used two-thirds of the output of the power plant. In 2006, the installation of a modern steam turbine brought the original electrical output of 449 MW up to 485 MW.

Nuclear fuel
In July 2011, Borssele received permission from the government to burn MOX fuel.  Currently, the uranium used by Borssele comes from Kazakhstan.

Radioactive waste
Areva NC reprocesses the spent fissionable material. Part of the deal is that the radioactive waste (i.e. the products of the reprocessing that are not useful) are taken back by the Netherlands.

The Central Organization for Radioactive Waste (COVRA), also in Borssele, is the national storage facility for all radioactive wastes. It is a surface facility suitable for the next 100 years.

Borssele produces around 12 tonnes of high level waste annually.

The nuclear plant had a long lasting contract with the nuclear recycling-factory in La Hague. This contract ended in 2015. Since 2006 it was impossible to transport the used fuel-rod to France, because the French laws on nuclear fuel were changed. The new law insisted that the nuclear waste should return to the Netherlands within a short period. This required a change in Dutch law too, but it took 5 years before all new permissions for transports were handled by the "Raad van State", and all questions of civilians and all opposition against the transports were handled properly. All that time it was impossible to send spent fuel to France, and the used fuel rods were piling up in the spent fuel pool. Between 2012 and 2015 ten transports were planned, in which each time 50 percent more fuel rods than usual would be taken by train to La Hague. The reprocessed uranium would be enriched in Russia, by mixing it with high enriched uranium from nuclear-powered submarines, discarded after the cold-war. A quarter of the uranium would stay in Russia, to be used in nuclear power stations there. The first transport was at 7 June 2011. Although activists tried to delay the transport, the next day the fuel rods arrived in La Hague.

Controversy

The use of nuclear energy is a controversial issue in Dutch politics. The first commercial nuclear plant in the Netherlands, Dodewaard, was decommissioned in 1997 after only 28 years of service. This decision was taken against the background of political opposition to nuclear energy. In 1994, government and parliament decided to close down the Borssele plant as of 2004. However, due to legal action by owners and employees of the plant and changes in government policy in 2002, the decommissioning was delayed until 2013, meaning the plant would exactly fulfill its originally intended life span of 40 years. 

In recent years nuclear energy has become less controversial in the Netherlands and is increasingly viewed as one of many possibilities to reduce carbon emissions and increase national energy self-reliance. As a result, the Dutch government decided in 2006 that Borssele would remain operational until 2033. 
In June 2006, the government made a contract ("Borssele-convenant") with the owners of the plant, Delta and Essent. Delta and Essent commit themselves to pay 250 million into a 'fonds voor duurzame energie' (fund for the R&D of renewable energy) from the profits generated by the operating time extension.

On December 15, 2021, the new Dutch coalition announced plans to build two new nuclear power plants in the Netherlands. The site for these new plants remains a question for now, but it is possible both could end up in Borssele as Rotterdam wants to focus on hydrogen power and Groningen is considered too controversial by most.

Unit 2

In 2009, the Dutch utility Delta, which owns 50% of Elektriciteits Produktiemaatschappij Zuid-Nederland (EPZ), submitted a start-up memorandum to the Ministry of Housing, Spatial Planning and the Environment, beginning the process of building a second unit at Borssele. 
The choice of reactor design for the new project has not been disclosed, although Delta says it expects construction costs to be in the order of €4–5 billion ($6–7 billion). The company said in 2009 that if all goes well, a construction permit application could be submitted in 2012, with a construction start date of 2013, and plant operation in 2018.
In January 2012, DELTA announced it was putting the plans for a "Borssele II" on hold for 2 or 3 years.

In June, Delta announced that it would become the majority shareholder of the nuclear power plant in Borssele.

Incidents 

In 1996 there was an INES 2-incident at Borssele. Nobody was hurt.

See also 

 List of nuclear reactors#Netherlands

Sources
Based on information from the website of the Dutch Ministry of Housing, Spatial Planning, and the Environment and the Energy Research Center of the Netherlands.

References

External links

Nuclear power plant data
IAEA PRIS - Borssele

Nuclear power stations in the Netherlands
Buildings and structures in Zeeland
Borssele II
Articles containing video clips
Borsele